The 1897 Metropolitan Rugby Union season was the 24th season of the Sydney Rugby Premiership. Six clubs competed from May till September 1897. The season culminated in the premiership, which was won by Randwick who were undefeated during the season. Randwick were crowned premiers by virtue of finishing the season on top of the table. This was the first premiership run under the new Metropolitan Rugby Football Union.

Teams 
Six clubs signed up with the Metropolitan Rugby Football Union to play the Senior Premiership. Each of the teams had participated in the premiership previously. The Paddington club had been disqualified from the competition at the end of the previous season due to unpaid Union fees. As a result, the club was newly formed at the beginning of the season. Paddington kept the identity and the history of the former club.

Season summary 
Early in the 1897, at the annual meeting for the New South Wales Rugby Football Union, a motion was passed to form a branch union to take over the running of club football. This new union was named the Metropolitan Rugby Football Union.

There was some discussion about the quality of play that football was producing in 1897. Some quarters declared that the standard had deteriorated over the past few seasons. However, it was suggested by others in the media that football was moving from individual heroics to team brilliance. The addition of talented players from the Junior ranks was welcomed with many of these players selected for representative honours.

The 1897 Sydney Rugby Premiership saw Randwick Football Club present its best performance to take all before it. The club were undefeated in all games during the season and won all three main awards, the Sydney Cricket Ground Trophy, Agricultural Society Trophy and the Premiership. Unfortunately, the Agricultural Society Trophy was stripped from the club and awarded to their opponents due to a technicality. Before playing the semi-final, Randwick requested to allow the New Zealander, Tom Pauling, to play for the team. The Union allowed him to play but, due to a protest by the Pirates after the completion of the final, the decision was revised. With the new decision, the Pirates were awarded the Agricultural Society Trophy.

After the introduction of new Juniors to the team, the Pirates Football Club transformed their season. During the previous season, the team failed to win a single game and began the new year with a pair of losses. With the arrival of Conlon, Boyd, Evers, McMahon, Ellis, Warman and Baird the team displayed improved form only slightly below that of the Premiers. The team were present in both trophy finals and finished the season runners-up. After the protest against Randwick was upheld, the Pirates were awarded with the Agricultural Society Trophy. Hopes were high for the future.

The two older clubs, Sydney University and Wallaroo, experienced less than their usual success during the season. Both teams were in the middle of a rebuilding phase, with older and more experienced players retiring from the game. New young blood was filtering into the ranks with hope that the clubs would soon be back to their high-class best. The 'Varsity displayed an upturn in their performance from previous seasons, giving the club promise for the future. Victory over the Pirates and an excellent game against the Premiers were the highlights of the season. Wallaroo experienced their worst season for a decade. This could be attributed to the injuries to key players, Row and Kelly. The team won only two games during the season and were unable to recruit Juniors of merit. With an infusion of new blood mixing with the sound, experienced players, it is believed that Wallaroo could achieve success once again.

Ladder

Ladder progression 

 Numbers highlighted in blue indicates the team finished first on the ladder in that round.
 Numbers highlighted in red indicates the team finished in last place on the ladder in that round

 Ladder include Finals matches.

Trophy finals

Finals Week 1, 19 June & 17 July

Sydney Cricket Ground Trophy 
The top four teams on the ladder qualified to compete for the Sydney Cricket Ground Trophy. Games were decided by draw with Wentworth and the Pirates facing off for the second successive week. This game ended with a 3 all draw and was replayed on 17 July. In the replay, the Pirates won easily 17 points to 6. In the second semi, Randwick had the better team resulting in a loss for Wallaroo 17 to 3.

Agricultural Society Trophy 
After missing out on playing for the SCG Trophy, the Sydney University Football Club still qualified for the Agricultural Society Trophy. As no other teams were still in existence to contend for the trophy, University proceeded directly to the next week of finals.

Finals Week 2, 24 July & 7 August

Sydney Cricket Ground Trophy 
There was much anticipation for the final, as many believed that the Pirates were the only club to end Randwick's unbeaten run. With the game played on a wet and muddy day, the result was almost what the crowd wanted. The ground was in such poor condition that the referee took a turn in the mud and humorously wore a muddy stain to show for it. The Pirates played a stronger wet-weather game and were able to hold Randwick to a nil all draw.

The replay final saw similar cold and squally weather. Despite the conditions, the game was commended for its fine display with both teams playing well. The score was 3 all at half time with Randwick eventually coming away as winners. The fact that Randwick did not score more points was due to the excellent defence of their opponents. Overall, the victors were the better team.

Agricultural Society Trophy 
The Wentworth club continued their slow decline from the highs of the previous season. After losing three out of their last four games, several fresh players were brought in to compete against the 'Varsity. For the first 15 to 20 minutes of the game, the two teams were equal. After that, University played with greater 'life' to win the game and progress. Wallaroo were awarded a bye and progressed into the semi finals.

Finals Week 3, 28 August

Agricultural Society Trophy 
Much of the brightness had disappeared by the time of the semi finals. Representative duties robbed the games of the finest players, with the two semi finals being played at the inconveniently distant Kensington Racecourse. Even with a weak team, Randwick were able to defeat a lacklustre University 24 to 3. The second semi saw a more even contest between the Pirates and Wallaroo. The game was closely fought until the eventual victors were able to take the lead near the end of the match.

Finals Week 4, 28 August

Agricultural Society Trophy 
Prior to the final being played, the Metropolitan Rugby Union reversed their decision to allow the New Zealander, Tom Pauling, to play for Randwick. However, the eventual Premiers were determined to include him in their squad. As a result, there was much ill feeling from the Pirates towards Randwick. This manifested itself in the game with players being called to explain their actions at a later hearing. Both teams were missing players due to representative duties which gave the crowd much hope for a Pirates victory. Eventually, Randwick were victorious, being more able to penetrate the defence of the opposition and make every play count. After the game, the Union made the decision to strip Randwick of the trophy and award it to the Pirates.

Statistics

Points

Tries 

 Statistics include Finals matches.

Lower grades 
The MRFU also conducted three junior competitions: First Juniors, Second Juniors, Third Juniors and Fourth Juniors.

First Juniors 
Ten clubs signed up for First Juniors. The teams that played were: Newtown, Petersham, Summer Hill Oaklands, Marrickville, University II, North Sydney, Mercantile, Homebush, Strathfield and Buccaneer. At the end of the regular rounds, the Buccaneer club were sitting at the top of the ladder. In the semi finals, Buccaneer won against Summer Hill Oaklands and Homebush defeated Mercantile. In the final, Homebush defeated Buccaneer 9 points to 4 to win the premiership.

Second Juniors 
Thirteen clubs submitted a team for Second Juniors. Teams were: Redfern Waratah, Richmond, University III, Parramatta Ormonde, Glebe, Manly Federal, Stanmore Institute, Adelphi, Rockdale, Pirates II, Waverley, Kogarah and Lyric. When the regular games were completed, Redfern Waratah, Glebe, Manly Federal and Rockdale qualified for the semi finals. The final saw Manly Federal defeated Redfern Waratah 9 points to nil. Manly Federal were declared premiers.

Third Juniors 
Eighteen clubs initially signed up to play Third Juniors. However, seventeen teams played in the competition. These teams were: Adelphi II, Bay View, Summer Hill Oaklands II, Granville Royal, East Sydney, Newtown Cambridge, Woollahra Junior, Chelsea, Avoca, Adler, Richmond II, Leichhardt Gladstone, Gladesville, Grosvenor, Endeavour, Iona and Homebush II. At the conclusion of the regular rounds, the final four teams playing in the semi finals were Newtown Cambridge, Endeavour, Leichhardt Gladstone and Bayview. The final saw Endeavour play Bayview for the premiership. Endeavour won the match 3 points to nil to remain undefeated for the year.

Fourth Juniors 
Sixteen clubs submitted a team to play Fourth Juniors. Teams in the competition were: Newtown Orlando, Newtown Avenue, Alexandria Premier, Balmain Waratah, Buccaneer II, Manly Federal II, Victoria, Chelsea II, St Mary's Union, Redfern Waratah II, Forest Lodge Cambridge, Carolina, Endeavour II, Pirates III, Redfern Cambridge and Willoughby Federal. The semi finals saw Victoria win against Balmain Waratah and Forest Lodge Cambridge defeat Alexandria Premiers. The final saw Forest Lodge Cambridge win against Victoria 6 points to 3 to be declared premiers.

Participating clubs

References

External links 

 Sydney Club Rugby History.

1897 in Australian rugby union
Rugby union competitions in New South Wales